"Come Go with Me" is a song by R&B group Pockets, released as a single in 1977 by Columbia Records. It reached No. 17 on the Billboard Hot R&B Singles chart and No. 32 on the Dance/Club Play chart.

Critical reception
Billboard described the song as having "a definite R&B feel, featuring horns and strings with an Earth Wind & Fire influence coming from its co-writer and producer Verdine White". AllMusic described the song as having "a progressive rhythm track" with "energized vocals" that's "filled with zest".

Charts

Other versions

Remixes and re-edits
A remixed version of the song is featured on the album, Remixed With Love By Joey Negro, Vol. 2 by Joey Negro, which also features  remixes of "I Love Music" by The O'Jays, "Love Ballad" by George Benson, and "Ride Like the Wind by Christopher Cross.

The song appears as well upon side 1 of  Eli Escobar's Money Lotion #8 - Escobar Edits on Money Studies Records, with Colonel Abrahams  "Trapped", and Loleatta Holloway's "Catch Me On The Rebound" on the record's flip side.

Covers
The Occasions featuring Tyrone Henry released a cover of the song in 1996 on the Feetmove record label.

References

1977 songs
1977 debut singles
1996 singles
Columbia Records singles
Songs written by Verdine White
Song recordings produced by Verdine White